Milan Neralić (26 February 1875 in Slunj – 17 February 1918 in Vienna) was a Croatia-Slavonian fencer who competed in the late 19th century and early 20th century for Austria-Hungary.

Biography
Born to a Croat family, in Kingdom of Croatia-Slavonia. He was the first person from present day Croatia to take part in the Olympic Games and the first one to win a medal. Neralić joined the army in 1893 and in 1895 took part in the Vienna newtown military fencing and gymnastics instructor course. His teachers included Heinrich Tenner and Rudolf Brosch.

He participated in fencing at the 1900 Summer Olympics in Paris and won the bronze medal in the Master's sabre. He was defeated by Italian fencer Italo Santelli in the semi-final.

Neralić spent most of his life in Berlin and Vienna working as fencing instructor. His most notable student was Richard Verderber, winner of the silver (saber team) and bronze (foil) medals at the 1912 Summer Olympics in Stockholm.

In his home town of Slunj, on the 147th anniversary of Neralić's birth a statue was unveiled by his niece Zrinka Vukelić.

References

External links

1875 births
1918 deaths
People from Slunj
Croatian male sabre fencers
Olympic bronze medalists for Austria
Olympic fencers of Austria
Fencers at the 1900 Summer Olympics
Olympic medalists in fencing
Medalists at the 1900 Summer Olympics
Serbs of Croatia
Theresian Military Academy alumni
Austrian male sabre fencers